The 2019-20 Lake Superior State Lakers men's ice hockey season was the 54th season of play for the program, the 47th at the Division I level and the 7th in the WCHA conference. The Lakers represented Lake Superior State University and were coached by Damon Whitten, in his 6th season.

Roster

As of September 9, 2019.

Standings

Schedule and results

|-
!colspan=12 style=";" | Regular Season

|-
!colspan=12 style=";" | 

|-
!colspan=12 style=";" | 

|- align="center" bgcolor="#e0e0e0"
|colspan=12|Lake Superior State Lost Series 1–2

Scoring statistics

Goaltending statistics

Rankings

References

Lake Superior State Lakers men's ice hockey seasons
Lake Superior State Lakers
Lake Superior State Lakers
Lake Superior State Lakers
Lake Superior State Lakers